Carlos Muñoz may refer to:

Carlos Muñoz Cobo (born 1961), Spanish football (soccer) player
Carlos Muñoz Pizarro (1913–1976), Chilean botanist
Carlos Muñoz (actor) (1919–2005), Spanish actor
Carlos Muñoz (Chilean footballer) (born 1989), Chilean football (soccer) player
Carlos Muñoz (Ecuadorian footballer) (1967–1993), Ecuadorian football (soccer) player
Carlos Muñoz (Mexican footballer) (born 1959), Mexican football (soccer) player
Carlos Muñoz (racing driver) (born 1992), Colombian racing driver
Carlos Muñoz (baseball) (born 1979), Panamanian baseball player
Carlos Muñoz (badminton), Colombian badminton player
Carlos Muñoz (professional wrestler) (born 1991), Mexican professional wrestler
Carlos Muñoz (wrestler) (born 1992), Colombian wrestler
Carlos Isaac Muñoz (born 1998), Spanish footballer